This is a list of countries by nickel production in 2019 based on data by the United States Geological Survey (USGS).

Countries

References 

Nickel